Moyne Abbey is a ruined medieval Franciscan friary in Killala, County Mayo, Ireland. Founded at some point before 1455, the abbey was suppressed in 1590.

History
It was founded before the year (1455) by McWilliam Bourke family as a Franciscan friary and consecrated in 1462. It is located north of Ballina on the west side of Killala Bay on the old Ballina or "French" road. Like its neighbour, Rosserk Friary, it was burnt by Sir Richard Bingham, Elizabeth I of England's governor of Connacht, in 1590 in reformationist zeal. It’s believed friars continued to reside there until about 1800.

The friary was built in the late Irish Gothic style and has extensive ruins, consisting of a church and domestic buildings situated around a central cloister.  Its west doorway is a seventeenth insertion.  Its east window displays fine switchline tracery.

Gallery

See also 

 List of abbeys and priories in Ireland (County Mayo)

References

External links
 Plan of Moyne friary
 Moyne friary cloister

Buildings and structures completed in 1462
Buildings and structures in County Mayo
Franciscan monasteries in the Republic of Ireland
Ruins in the Republic of Ireland
Christian monasteries established in the 15th century
National Monuments in County Mayo
Gothic architecture in the Republic of Ireland